The  fringe-toed sand lizard  (Uma exsul) is a species of lizard in the family Phrynosomatidae. It is endemic to Mexico. It is omnivorous, with the ability to detect food chemically by tongue-flicking.

References

Uma
Reptiles of Mexico
Reptiles described in 1947
Taxa named by Karl Patterson Schmidt